Saari is a Finnish surname (meaning island) and a Malaysian patronymic name.

Geographical distribution
As of 2014, 52.8% of all known bearers of the surname Saari were residents of Finland (frequency 1:672), 24.7% of the United States (1:27,582), 8.5% of Malaysia (1:22,083), 3.2% of Canada (1:73,892), 2.7% of Sweden (1:23,557), 2.6% of Indonesia (1:327,349) and 1.8% of Thailand (1:254,526).

In Finland, the frequency of the surname was higher than national average (1:672) in the following regions:
 1. South Ostrobothnia (1:235)
 2. Central Ostrobothnia (1:246)
 3. Southwest Finland (1:411)
 4. Ostrobothnia (1:475)
 5. Pirkanmaa (1:503)
 6. Satakunta (1:563)
 7. Tavastia Proper (1:576)
 8. Päijänne Tavastia (1:665)

People
Abdul Halim Saari (born 1994), Malaysian football  midfielder 
Arto Saari (born 1981), Finnish skateboarder and photographer
Chris Saari (born 1962), American association football midfielder
Donald G. Saari (born 1940), American mathematician
Eero Saari (born 1928), Finnish ice hockey player 
Ernst Saari (1882–1918), Finnish farmer and politician
Faizal Saari (born 1991), Malaysian field hockey player
Fitri Saari (born 1993), Malaysian field hockey player, brother of Faizal
Heikki Saari (born 1984), Finnish drummer
Henn Saari (1924–1999), Estonian linguist
Henry Saari (born 1964), Finnish actor, director and porn star
Irina Saari (born 1975), Finnish singer
Jaakko Saari (born 1957), Finnish judoka
Jarmo Saari, Finnish a guitarist, composer and producer 
Kirsikka Saari (born 1973), Finnish film maker and screenwriter
Kyllikki Saari (1935–1953), Finnish homicide victim
Lauri Saari (1888–1953), Finnish painter 
Maija Saari (born 1986), Finnish football defender
Matti Saari (disambiguation) – multiple people
Mattias Saari (born 1994), Swedish ice hockey player
Meeri Saari (born 1925), Finnish shot putter
Milla Saari (born 1975), Finnish cross country skier 
Mohd Fadzli Saari (born 1983), Malaysian footballer and coach
Per Saari (born 1975), American film executive producer and Emmy winner for the limited series Big Little Lies (2017)
Þór Saari (born 1960), member of the Icelandic parliament
Rami Saari (born 1963), Israeli poet, translator, linguist and literary critic
Ray Saari (born 1995), American association football player
Roy Saari (1945–2008), American swimmer
Saila Saari (born 1989), Finnish ice hockey player 
Sami Saari (born 1962), Finnish soul musician
Sanna-Kaisa Saari (born 1987), Swedish-Finnish beauty pageant titleholder
Santeri Saari (born 1994), Finnish ice hockey defenceman
Wilho Saari, Finnish American player of the kantele, the Finnish psaltery
Wimme Saari (born 1959), Finnish Sami musician
U-Wei Haji Saari (born 1954), Malaysian film director

References

Finnish-language surnames
Surnames of Finnish origin